Jumah Faraj Mohamed (born ) is a Qatari male volleyball player. He was part of the Qatar men's national volleyball team and competed at the 2010 Asian Games. With his club Al-Arabi he competed at the 2012 FIVB Volleyball Men's Club World Championship.

References

External links
 profile at FIVB.org

1985 births
Living people
Qatari men's volleyball players
Place of birth missing (living people)
Volleyball players at the 2006 Asian Games
Volleyball players at the 2010 Asian Games
Volleyball players at the 2014 Asian Games
Asian Games competitors for Qatar